George Nelson Hunt III (December 6, 1931 – October 23, 2022) was the Episcopal Bishop of Rhode Island from 1980 to 1994.

Early life, education and family
The son of George Nelson Hunt Jr. and Jessie Mae Alter Hunt, Hunt was born in Louisville, Kentucky, and attended the University of the South, at Sewanee, Tennessee, where he was awarded a B.A. in 1953. He went on to the Virginia Theological Seminary in Alexandria, Virginia, where he earned his M.Div. degree and was ordained to the ministry in 1956. He received the degree of Doctor of Divinity from Yale University in 1980 and the University of Rhode Island awarded him an honorary L.H.D. in 1995. In June 1955, he married Barbara Noel Plamp, with whom he had three children.

Career
In 1956, he was appointed vicar of Holy Trinity Church in Gillette, Wyoming and in 1957, additionally, he became a priest in charge of St. John's Church in Upton, Wyoming, adding in 1959 the additional responsibilities of the priest in charge of St. Francis Church, Wright, Wyoming. In 1960, he was appointed assistant priest at St. Paul's Church in Oakland, California and was in that post, when in 1962 he was called to be rector of St. Alban's Church, Worland, Wyoming. Remaining there until 1965, he then became rector of St Anselm's Church in Lafayette, California and in 1970, rector of St. Paul's Church, Salinas, California. From 1975 to 1980, he served as executive officer of the Episcopal Diocese of California before being consecrated in 1980 as bishop of the Episcopal Diocese of Rhode Island. 

In 1994, he left Rhode Island to serve as interim bishop of the Episcopal Diocese of Hawaii until his retirement in 1996.

References

1931 births
2022 deaths
Religious leaders from Louisville, Kentucky
American Episcopalians
American Episcopal priests
Sewanee: The University of the South alumni
University of Rhode Island alumni
Virginia Theological Seminary alumni
Episcopal bishops of Rhode Island